Henry Christian Wente (August 18, 1936 – January 20, 2020) was an American mathematician, known for his 1986 discovery of the Wente torus, an immersed constant-mean-curvature surface whose existence disproved a conjecture of Heinz Hopf.

Wente obtained both his bachelor's degree and his Ph.D. from Harvard University. He completed his doctorate in 1966, under the supervision of Garrett Birkhoff. He was a distinguished professor emeritus of mathematics at the University of Toledo, which he joined in 1971. In 1986 he was an Invited Speaker at the International Congress of Mathematicians (ICM) in Berkeley, California. In 2012 he became a fellow of the American Mathematical Society.

Selected publications

Articles

Books

References

1936 births
2020 deaths
20th-century American mathematicians
21st-century American mathematicians
Harvard University alumni
University of Toledo faculty
Fellows of the American Mathematical Society